An Evening Visit is a 1934 German comedy film directed by Georg Jacoby and starring Liane Haid, Paul Hörbiger and Harald Paulsen.

The film's sets were designed by the art directors Gustav A. Knauer and Alexander Mügge.

Cast

References

External links

Films directed by Georg Jacoby
Films of Nazi Germany
German black-and-white films
German musical comedy films
1934 musical comedy films
1930s German films